Frederick Robert Branfman (March 18, 1942 – September 24, 2014) was an American anti-war activist and author of a number of books about the Indochina War who exposed the covert bombing of Laos by the US. Working as the Director of Project Air War in 1969 he wrote about the U.S. bombing in Indochina, which he claimed was directed at civilians.

Life
Branfman was born in New York City in 1942. He received in bachelor's degree from the University of Chicago in political science and his master's degree in education from Harvard University. Branfman worked as a policy advisor for former California governor Jerry Brown, Gary Hart and Tom Hayden. 
Branfman was working as an educational advisor for the U.S. government in Laos, when in September 1969 thousands of refugees fled into the Laotian capital of Vientiane. Working as a translator for international media, he began to interpret thousands of villagers' stories, telling of planes dropping bombs.

Told by U.S. officials in Laos that Americans had nothing to do with the bombs, Branfman became consumed with the desire to understand what was happening. 
Gathering details, he journeyed to Washington and spoke at a special session of the U.S. Senate Committee on Refugees, exposing the U.S. government's covert activities.

In his last years, Branfman worked as a writer, living in Santa Barbara and Budapest. His articles have appeared in The New York Times, The Washington Post, Harper's Magazine, Playboy, Salon and The New Republic. 
He contributed to the Glendon Association. 
He also contributed to the traveling exhibition Legacies of War, that was created to raise awareness about the history of the Vietnam War-era bombing in Laos. 
In the acclaimed 2007 TV documentary, now released on DVD, Most Secret Place On Earth: CIA's Covert War In Laos Branfman is one of those who speak to camera.

He died in Budapest, Hungary, of amyotrophic lateral sclerosis (ALS) in 2014 at the age of 72.

Books 
 The Third Indochina War, Bertrand Russell Peace Foundation, 
 The Old Man: A Biographical Account of a Lao Villager.
 Voices from The Plain of Jars, Life Under an Air War, Harper & Row 1972. Reprinted by the University of Wisconsin Press with a new introduction in 2010.
 Life under the bombs, Project Air War, Harper & Row, 1972, 
 The Village of the Deep Pond, Ban Xa Phang Meuk, Laos, International Area Studies Programs, University of Massachusetts Amherst, 1978, ASIN: B0000E92G5

References

External links 
 Fred Branfman's Internet presence
 Fred Branfman: War Crimes in Indochina and Our Troubled National Soul  Nuclear Age Peace Foundation, 1998
 Fred Branfman: On Torture and Being "Good Americans" The Huffington Post, 29. April 2007
 Fred Branfman: Indochina: The illusion of withdrawal May 1973
 Fred Branfman: We Must All Be Prepared to Torture, Antiwar.com, January 26, 2006
 Fred Branfman, ¡Presente! on Huffington Post, October 3, 2014
 NY Times obituary
 The Economist obituary

2014 deaths
American male writers
American anti-war activists
1942 births
Deaths from motor neuron disease
Writers from New York City
University of Chicago alumni
Harvard Graduate School of Education alumni
Activists from New York City